San Agustin, officially the Municipality of San Agustin (Surigaonon: Lungsod nan San Agustin), is a 4th class municipality in the province of Surigao del Sur, Philippines. According to the 2020 census, it has a population of 22,855 people.

The town is famous for the Britania Group of Islands (or simply Britania Islets), a group of 24 islands with white sandbar beaches scattered across waters of the Lianga Bay, overlooking the Philippine Sea.

Geography

Barangays
San Agustin is politically subdivided into 13 barangays.
 Britania
 Buatong
 Buhisan
 Gata
 Hornasan
 Janipaan
 Kauswagan
 Oteiza
 Poblacion
 Pong-on
 Pongtod
 Salvacion
 Santo Niño

Demographics

Economy

References

External links

 San Agustin Profile at PhilAtlas.com
   San Agustin Profile at the DTI Cities and Municipalities Competitive Index
 [ Philippine Standard Geographic Code]
 Philippine Census Information
 Local Governance Performance Management System

Municipalities of Surigao del Sur